Capirona is a monotypic genus of flowering plants in the family Rubiaceae. The genus contains only one species, viz. Capirona decorticans, which is native to northern South America. It has been reported from French Guiana, Guyana, Suriname, Venezuela, Colombia, Ecuador, Perú, and northern Brazil.

References

External links 
 Capirona in the World Checklist of Rubiaceae
 Kew Neotropical Plants Image Database
 Shutterstock, peeling bark of the capirona tree (Capirona decorticans) in the Ecuadorian Amazon
 ALRfoto, fotos de Capirona decorticans 
 Field Museum, Neotropical Herbarium Specimens

Monotypic Rubiaceae genera
Dialypetalantheae
Trees of Peru
Trees of Bolivia
Trees of Ecuador
Trees of Venezuela